Virunthali is a 2010 Tamil language romantic drama film directed by Udayasankaran Whaterman. The film stars newcomer Michael Ishwar and Vidya Pradeep, with Gopika Rajesh, Nassar, Bala Singh, Singampuli, Appukutty and Ambani Shankar playing supporting roles. The film, produced by Rajesh Gopinath, had musical score by S. S. Kumaran and was released on 16 July 2010.

Plot

In a small village in Madurai, Ishvar (Ishvar) is a hard-boiled money lender who hangs up with his sidekick Oli Shankar (Singampuli) and Ishvar lives in a luxurious bungalow with his mother. Ishvar is eagerly awaiting the release of his father (Nassar) who is in jail for murder and his family is highly respected by the villagers. One day, the law student Archana (Vidya Pradeep), daughter of the village postman Rangarajan (Bala Singh), comes to the village. Each encounter between Ishvar and Archana ends up in a quarrel but they eventually fall in love with each other. When Rangarajan falls sick, Archana is forced to do her father's job while Ishvar stops lending money and opens a pawn shop. In the meantime, Ishvar helps his friend Arun to marry his lover Kanaka. Kanaka was brought up by her aunt and uncle who want to appropriate her inheritance.

Meanwhile, Ishvar's father returns from jail. Arun is then killed by Kanaka's family with the help of the corrupt Sub-Inspector Muttaiah (Cheran Raj) and a shocked Archana witnesses it. Kanaka's family abducts Kanaka and forces her to give them her inheritance. Archana then reveals everything to Ishvar and a vengeful Ishvar saves Kanaka. Thereafter, some goons kill Archana in her house and stage the murder to look like suicide by hanging. Overwhelmed by his lover's death, Ishvar becomes mentally ill.

Cast

Michael Ishwar as Ishvar
Vidya Pradeep as Archana
Gopika Rajesh as Gopika
Nassar as Ishvar's father
Bala Singh as Rangarajan, Archana's father
Singampuli as Oli Shankar
Cheran Raj as Sub-Inspector Muttaiah
Appukutty as Kaadu
Ambani Shankar as Parthiban
Harish Ori
Sivathanu
Bhuvan
Bharathi
Prema Priya
Risha in a special appearance

Production
Director Udayasankaran Whaterman, who hailed from Kerala and had worked as an associate director with A. K. Lohithadas, made his directorial debut with Virunthali under the banner of  Gopika International. Ishvar (also known as Anand Michael and Jack Michael) was selected to play the hero while Vidya Pradeep (credited as Dhyana) who played the second heroine in Aval Peyar Thamizharasi (2010) was chosen to play the female lead role. Music baton was wielded by S. S. Kumaran of Poo fame, Raja Mohammad took care of the editing and the cinematography was by Sajan Kalathil.

Soundtrack

The film score and the soundtrack were composed by S. S. Kumaran. The soundtrack, released in 2010, features 6 tracks. The audio was launched by Cheran at Kamala Cinemas in Chennai. Kalaipuli G. Sekaran, Prasanna, Karan, Ezhil and Sasi attended the audio launch. A reviewer rated the album 2 out of 5 and said, "Kumaran has added a nice polish to his musical expression in this album. His sense of aesthetics is strong. What he needs is more spontaneity in terms of musical notes".

Release
The film was released on 16 July 2010 alongside three other films.

Critical reception
Behindwoods.com rated the film 0.5 out of 5 and said, "Virunthali is nothing but an attempt at movie making, a bad one at that. In the end, the director might have learnt some lessons".Indiaglitz.com wrote, "Ishvar looks good as rough villager. Dhyana is adequate [..] What begins on a promising note ends up a tame affair. Though the basic knot is good, Whaterman seems to have watered down the theme and laced it with so-called commercial elements that prove to be a mismatch". Sify stated, "The film is poor in imagination, content and visuals and you have non-actors in the lead making it tedious to watch. It requires a lot of patience to sit through this big bore, that lacks basic fundamentals of filmmaking". A reviewer rated the film 2 out of 5 and said, "The director has come up with an interesting thought but he failed in the presentation and narrative departments. The dialogues were so-so, the script was spineless, the screenplay was mediocre".

Box office
The film took an average opening at the Chennai box office.

References

2010 films
2010s Tamil-language films
2010 romantic drama films
Indian romantic drama films
2010 directorial debut films